Proszew A is a village in the administrative district of Gmina Grębków, within Węgrów County, Masovian Voivodeship, in east-central Poland.

The village has a population of 167.

References

Proszew A